The list of shipwrecks in April 1923 includes ships sunk, foundered, grounded, or otherwise lost during April 1923.

1 April

3 April

5 April

6 April

7 April

8 April

9 April

17 April

21 April

23 April

24 April 

  Thirty-one died, seven when the Mossamedes capsized and 24 others who were in a lifeboat that sank.  The 206 survivors were picked up by the French gunboat Cassiopee, the Portuguese gunboat Salvador Correia and by fishing vessels from Porto Alexandre in Angola.

25 April

26 April

29 April

Unknown date

References

1923-04
Maritime incidents in April 1923
04
April 1923 events